Jukka Vanninen (born 31 January 1977) is a retired Finnish football player who last played for RiPS.

References
Guardian Football

1977 births
Living people
FC Jazz players
FC Honka players
Exeter City F.C. players
Bashley F.C. players
Finnish footballers
FC Hämeenlinna players
Kotkan Työväen Palloilijat players
FC Lahti players
Veikkausliiga players
English Football League players
Ykkönen players
Association football midfielders
People from Riihimäki
Sportspeople from Kanta-Häme